Fort Stevens was an American military installation that guarded the mouth of the Columbia River in the state of Oregon. Built near the end of the American Civil War, it was named for a slain Civil War general and former Washington Territory governor, Isaac I. Stevens. The fort was an active military reservation from 1863–1947. It is now listed on the National Register of Historic Places.

Today the site is an Oregon state park just northwest of Warrenton.

History

Civil War 

The fort was constructed in 1863-64 during the Civil War as an earthwork battery on the south shore of the mouth of the Columbia River, and was known as the Fort at Point Adams.  It was later renamed as Fort Stevens in 1865, in honor of the former territorial governor of Washington, Isaac Stevens, who had been killed in action at the Battle of Chantilly during the American Civil War.

Fort Stevens was the primary military installation in what became the "Three Fort Harbor Defense System" at the mouth of the Columbia River. The other forts were the Post at Cape Disappointment, later Fort Cape Disappointment and later Fort Canby, built at the same time as Fort Stevens, and Fort Columbia, built between 1896 and 1904. Both are on the Washington side of the river. The fort was meant to defend the mouth of the Columbia from potential British attack during the Pig War of 1859 and subsequent ongoing regional tensions through 1870 in the San Juan Islands, and was important during the 1896-1903 Alaska Boundary Dispute, when British-American tensions again were high and the two countries were on the brink of war.

Peter Iredale 
In 1906, the crew of the sailing ship Peter Iredale took refuge at Fort Stevens, after she ran aground on Clatsop Spit. The wreck is visible today, within the boundaries of Fort Stevens State Park.

World War II 

After WWI, the U.S. Navy established a radio station onboard Ft. Stevens for communication with the fleet.  Additionally, in 1932 the Navy co-located a secret radio intercept station at Ft. Stevens to listen-in on Japanese navy coded messages.  Specially trained radiomen from the "On-the-Roof-Gang" were stationed to the listening post.  The station was designated "S" because of the Ft. Stevens location. It was designated to be restored as a historical monument by the federal government in 1936. In September 1939, the U.S. Navy relocated Station S to Fort Ward on Bainbridge Island, Washington because of better intercept conditions.

On the night of June 21–22, 1942, the Japanese submarine I-25 surfaced off Fort Stevens and fired 17 shells from her 14 cm-caliber deck gun, making Fort Stevens the first military installation in the Contiguous United States to come under enemy fire in World War II. The Japanese attack caused no damage to the fort itself, it only destroyed the backstop of the post's baseball field.

The garrison of Fort Stevens during World War II included elements of two regiments, the 249th Coast Artillery (Oregon National Guard) and the 18th Coast Artillery of the Regular Army.

Fort Stevens was decommissioned in 1947. All the armaments were removed and buildings were auctioned. The grounds were transferred to the Corps of Engineers, until finally being turned over to the Oregon Parks and Recreation Department in 1975.

State park 
Much of Fort Stevens is preserved within Fort Stevens State Park, part of the Lewis and Clark National Historical Park. The  park includes camping, beach access, swimming at Coffenbury Lake, trails, and a military history museum. As of 2019, it was the eighth busiest park in the state's park system with 1,197,738 visitors that year.

The large state park boasts full hook up campsites, primitive and electrical sites, yurts, and deluxe cabins; most are pet friendly. The campgrounds have full use facilities nearby and there are over nine miles of paved bicycle trails, fishing, a historic shipwreck, and underground tours of the military battery.

In the Media

Television
Fort Stevens was featured on an episode of Ghost Adventures entitled "Graveyard of the Pacific: Commander's House" that aired in 2018 on the Travel Channel. The team of paranormal investigators explored Battery Mishler, one of the artillery stations with underground tunnels at the fort where eyewitnesses report seeing a male shadow figure in the Magazine room. The fort is also said to be haunted by a soldier (August Stallberger) who was mysteriously beaten to death by "person(s) unknown" while on duty in 1868.

Gallery

See also 
Board of Fortifications
Attacks on United States territory in North America during World War II
Oregon Coast Trail, the northern terminus is in Fort Stevens

References

External links 

 

Closed installations of the United States Army
State parks of Oregon
1863 establishments in Oregon
Stevens
National Register of Historic Places in Clatsop County, Oregon
Oregon in the American Civil War
Stevens
Museums in Clatsop County, Oregon
Military and war museums in Oregon
Parks in Clatsop County, Oregon
1947 disestablishments in Oregon
Stevens
World War II on the National Register of Historic Places
American Civil War on the National Register of Historic Places